The Armistice of Salonica (also known as the Armistice of Thessalonica) was signed on 29 September 1918 between Bulgaria and the Allied Powers in Thessaloniki. The convention followed a request by the Bulgarian  government for a ceasefire on 24 September.

Surrender
The armistice effectively ended Bulgaria's participation in World War I on the side of the Central Powers and came into effect on the Bulgarian Front at noon on 30 September. The armistice regulated the demobilization and the disarmament of the Bulgarian armed forces.

The signatories were, for the Allies, French General Louis Franchet d'Espérey, commander of the Allied Army of the Orient, and a commission appointed by the Bulgarian government, which was composed of General Ivan Lukov (member of the Bulgarian Army headquarters), Andrey Lyapchev (cabinet member) and Simeon Radev (diplomat).

Its importance was described by German Emperor Wilhelm II in his telegram to Bulgarian Tsar Ferdinand I: "Disgraceful! 62,000 Serbs decided the war!"

On 29 September 1918, the Oberste Heeresleitung (German Supreme Army Command) informed Wilhelm and the German Chancellor, Count Georg von Hertling, that Germany's military situation was hopeless. On 14 October 1918, the Austro-Hungarian Empire asked for an armistice, and on 15 October 1918 Turkish Grand vizier Ahmed Izzet Pasha sent a captured British general, Charles Vere Ferrers Townshend, to the Allies to seek terms for an armistice.

Terms
The terms called for the immediate demobilization of all Bulgarian military activities. It ordered the evacuation of Bulgarian-occupied Greek and Serbian territories, placed limits and restrictions to the size of Bulgaria's military employment and required Bulgaria to return military equipment that had been taken from the Greek Fourth Army Corps during the Bulgarian occupation of Eastern Macedonia in 1916. German and Austrian-Hungarian troops were to leave Bulgaria within four weeks. Bulgaria and especially Sofia were not to be occupied, but the Allies had the right to occupy some strategic points temporarily and to transfer troops over Bulgarian territory.

According to Article 5, about 150,000 Bulgarian soldiers to the west of the Skopje meridian were to be delivered to the Entente as hostages.

The French would send troops to Romania and the British and Greeks to European Turkey, which was still at war with the Allies.

The armistice would remain in effect until the conclusion of the Treaty of Neuilly-sur-Seine, the final general peace treaty, in November 1919.

References

Sources

 (1919) "Bulgaria Armistice Convention, September 29th, 1918". The American Journal of International Law Vol. 13 No.4 Supplement: Official Documents, 402-404.

See also
Battle of Dobro Pole
Serbian Campaign of World War I
Macedonian front

1918 in Greece
World War I treaties
Bulgaria in World War I
Treaties concluded in 1918
Treaties entered into force in 1918
Treaties of the Kingdom of Bulgaria
Salonica
1918 in Bulgaria
Macedonian front
Treaties of the United Kingdom (1801–1922)
Modern history of the Balkans
Modern history of Thessaloniki
1918 establishments in Bulgaria
Bulgaria–France relations
Bulgaria–United Kingdom relations
September 1918 events